In four-dimensional Euclidean geometry, the omnitruncated tesseractic honeycomb is a uniform space-filling honeycomb. It has omnitruncated tesseract, truncated cuboctahedral prism, and 8-8 duoprism facets in an irregular 5-cell vertex figure.

Related honeycombs

See also 
 Truncated square tiling
 Omnitruncated cubic honeycomb
Regular and uniform honeycombs in 4-space:
Tesseractic honeycomb
16-cell honeycomb
24-cell honeycomb
Truncated 24-cell honeycomb
Snub 24-cell honeycomb
 5-cell honeycomb
 Truncated 5-cell honeycomb
 Omnitruncated 5-cell honeycomb

References 
 Coxeter, H.S.M. Regular Polytopes, (3rd edition, 1973), Dover edition,  p. 296, Table II: Regular honeycombs
 Kaleidoscopes: Selected Writings of H.S.M. Coxeter, edited by F. Arthur Sherk, Peter McMullen, Anthony C. Thompson, Asia Ivic Weiss, Wiley-Interscience Publication, 1995,  
 (Paper 24) H.S.M. Coxeter, Regular and Semi-Regular Polytopes III, [Math. Zeit. 200 (1988) 3-45]
 George Olshevsky, Uniform Panoploid Tetracombs, Manuscript (2006) (Complete list of 11 convex uniform tilings, 28 convex uniform honeycombs, and 143 convex uniform tetracombs) 
  x4x3x3x4x - otatit - O103

5-polytopes
Honeycombs (geometry)
Truncated tilings